Subhonil Ghosh (born 12 April 2000) in Kolkata, West Bengal, is an Indian professional footballer who played as a midfielder for Garhwal FC on loan from East Bengal.

Career
Subhonil started his career with the youth academy of East Bengal F.C. in 2017 and played for the East Bengal F.C. U18 team in the U18 Elite League.

In 2019, Subhonil was promoted to the senior side by Alejandro Menendez and made his debut against George Telegraph S.C. in the 2019-20 Calcutta Premier Division League.

He was included in the squad for the 2019-20 I-League. On 31 January 2020, he was released by the club.

Career statistics

Club
Statistics accurate as of 15 March 2020

References

External links

2000 births
Living people
Footballers from Kolkata
Indian footballers
I-League players
East Bengal Club players
Association football midfielders